Sabha Parva, also called the "Book of the Assembly Hall", is the second of eighteen books of Mahabharata. Sabha Parva traditionally has 10 parts and 81 chapters. The critical edition of Sabha Parva has 9 parts and 72 chapters.

Sabha Parva starts with the description of the palace and assembly hall (sabha) built by Maya, at Indraprastha. Chapter 5 of the book outlines over a hundred principles of governance and administration necessary for a kingdom and its citizens to be prosperous, virtuous and happy. The middle parts describe life at the court, Yudhishthira's Rajasuya Yajna that leads to the expansion of the Pandava brothers' empire. The last two parts describe the one vice and addiction of the virtuous king Yudhishthira - gambling. Shakuni, encouraged by Duryodhana, mocks Yudhishthira and tempts him into a game of dice. Yudhishthira bets everything and loses the game, leading to the eventual exile of the Pandavas.

The book also details the principle of evil and crime against humanity, of why individuals who themselves have not been harmed must act regardless when society at large suffers systematic crime and injustice - this theory is outlined in the story of Magadha, Chapters 20 through 24, where the trio of Krishna, Arjuna and Bhima slay Jarasandha.

Structure and chapters 
Sabha Parva has 10 sub-parvas (parts, little books), and a total of 81 chapters (sections). The following are the sub-parvas:

 1. Sabhakriya Parva (Chapters: 1–4)
 The first parva of second book describes the construction of palace for Yudhishthira and his brothers, then the finished palace. Sages and kings are invited to celebrate the completion of palace.

 2. Lokapala Sabhakhayana Parva (Chapters: 5–13)
 Sage Narada arrives at the palace for celebrations. The sage rhetorically explains the theory of state craft for kings, how to find the most able people and make them ministers, how to train and take care of military, watch over enemies, rules of espionage, rules of war, support families of veterans who die or get injured at war, the support of farmers and merchants, care for poor and distressed in their empire, policies on tax, create incentive for Artha and prosperity, free trade, reward merit, pursue and punish criminal activities, deliver justice equally and without favor. Narada proclaims it is the duty of the king to serve the cause of Dharma, Artha and Kama in his kingdom. This theory of administration and governance of a kingdom in Sabha Parva, summarizes the detailed discussions in the Indian classic Arthashastra, claim scholars. The other Indian Epic, Ramayana has a similar kaccid summary chapter on fair administration and the rule of law. Yudhishthira promises to follow Narada's advice. Narada describes the design, architecture and assembly halls of Yama, Varuna, Indra, Kubera and Brahma. Narada asks Yudhishthira to perform Rajasuya.

 3. Rajasuyarambha Parva (Chapters: 14–19)
 Krishna explains why Jarasandha - the king of Magadha - should be killed, why human sacrifices by Jarasandha must be stopped, Jarasandha's prisoners freed. This would also help complete Rajasuya, he counsels Yudhishthira. Krishna is asked why Jarasandha is powerful as well as evil. He explains with the story of Vrihatratha (lord of the earth) and demoness Jara, how Jarasandha was named after the demoness.

 4. Jarasandha-vadha Parva (Chapters: 20–24)
 
 Krishna, Arjuna and Bhima arrive at Magadha, a prosperous kingdom inherited and ruled by Jarasandha. Krishna describes how King Goutama married Ushinara - a Sudra woman - and they had famous sons. They visit Jarasandha, who demands to know why he is being considered an enemy of Krishna, Arjuna and Bhima, when he has done nothing wrong to any of them personally. Krishna explains that persecution of men is cruelty to virtuous life, and human sacrifice is a crime against humanity.  Such a crime is sin that touches every one, including Bhima, Arjuna and him. Jarasandha's sin is injustice that must be challenged. They invite him to either release all the prisoners scheduled for human sacrifice or accept a battle to death. Jarasandha chooses war, picks Bhima as the adversary. Krishna counsels Bhima on principles of just war theory, a theory that appears in more detail in other books of Mahabharata. Bhima kills Jarasandha. The prisoners targeted for human sacrifices are freed.

 5. Digvijaya Parva (Chapters: 25–31)
 Pandava brothers expand their empire. Arjuna conquers the north, Bhima the east, Sahadeva the south, and Nakula wins the west. Yudhishthira is declared Dharmaraja. Digvijaya Parva describes the geography, tribes and various kingdoms as these brothers go in different directions to expand their empire.

 6. Rajasuyika Parva (Chapters: 32–34)
 Krishna visits Yudhishthira with presents. The Pandava brothers prepare for Rajasuya ceremony.

 7. Arghyaharana Parva (Chapters: 35–38)
 Kings, sages and visitors from around the world arrive for Rajasuya ceremony. Sahadeva offers Arghya - an offering with worship - to Krishna. Shishupala objects. Kings take sides. Hostilities begin. Shishupala leaves with some kings following him. Yudhishthira attempts reconciliation and peace talks.

 8. Shishupala-vadha Parva (Chapters: 39–44)
 The sub-parva describes how and why Krishna first refuses to fight Shishupala, but finally kills him in the assembly hall during the Rajasuya yagna. Krishna leaves.

 9. Dyuta Parva (Chapters: 45–73)
 Shakuni, the maternal uncle of Duryodhana, advises him that Pandava brothers cannot be defeated in a battle or by virtuous means; the only way to vanquish them is to exploit the weakness of Yudhishthira, his fondness for gambling. Duryodhana asks Dhritarashtra to exploit Yudhishthira's weakness over the game of dice. They ask Shakuni to tempt and defeat Yudhishthira. Shakuni provokes Yudhishthira for the game of dice. Yudhishthira shows reluctance to gambling. Shakuni mocks him. Yudhishthira accepts the provocation, bets his kingdom, his brothers, himself, and finally his wife in the 20th round of the game of dice; Shakuni wins everything. Draupadi is humiliated in the Assembly Hall by disrobing; her virtue leads gods to protect her in a skirt. Upset Draupadi questions the game, argues that she is not owned by Yudhishthira, the 20th round was flawed because it wrongfully treated her as property. Everyone in the Assembly Hall, including Yudhishthira and Dhritarashtra agree. The entire gambling game is declared invalid, Yudhishthira recovers everything he had lost.

 10. Anudyuta Parva (Chapters: 74–81)
 Yudhishthira is invited back again for the game of dice, Yudhishthira succumbs, and they play for one stake. Dhritarashtra bets kingdom of Hastinapur and Yudhishthira bets kingdom of Indraprastha. They agree that the loser will go into exile for 12 years and the 13th year, unrecognized in some inhabited place, and if they are recognized in the 13th year they are found then they would go into exile for another 12 years. Yudhishthira loses the game of dice again. The Pandava brothers move into exile. Dhritarashtra comes to power. Sages counsel him to make peace with Pandavas, seek a solution that unites the two sides. Dhritarashtra refuses. Scholars have questioned why Yudhishthira the Dharmaraja, who had it all, and was praised for enabling an empire infused with Dharma, Artha and Kama, who was so consistently ethical and moral until the last two Parvas, succumbs so suddenly to gambling.

English translations
Several translations of the Sanskrit book Sabha Parva in English are available. Two translations from 19th century, now in public domain, are those by Kisari Mohan Ganguli and Manmatha Nath Dutt. The translations are not consistent in parts, and vary with each translator's interpretations. For example:

Chapter 5, Verses 2-9 from Sabha Parva in Sanskrit:

Translation by Manmatha Nath Dutt:

Translation by Kisari Mohan Ganguli:

The total number of original verses depend on which Sanskrit source is used, and these do not equal the total number of translated verses in each chapter, in both Ganguli and Dutt translations. Mahabharata, like many ancient Sanskrit texts, was transmitted across generations verbally, a practice that was a source of corruption of its text, deletion of verses, as well as the addition of extraneous verses over time. The structure, prose, meter and style of translations vary within chapters between the translating authors.

Clay Sanskrit Library has published a 15 volume set of the Mahabharata which includes a translation of Sabha Parva by Paul Wilmot. This translation is modern and uses an old manuscript of the Epic. The translation does not remove verses and chapters now widely believed to be spurious and smuggled into the Epic in 1st or 2nd millennium AD.

J. A. B. van Buitenen published an annotated edition of Sabha Parva, reflecting the verses common in multiple versions of the Mahabharata. Buitenen suggests Sabha Parva had less corruption, deletion and addition of extraneous verses over time than Adi Parva. Debroy, in his 2011 overview of Mahabharata, notes that updated critical edition of Sabha Parva, with spurious and corrupted text removed, has 9 parts, 72 adhyayas (chapters) and 2,387 shlokas (verses). Debroy's translation of the critical edition of Sabha Parva appears in Volume 2 of his series. Sabha Parva is considered one of pivotable books among the eighteen books, the gambling and exile episode is often dramatized in modern productions of the Mahabharata.

Quotations and teachings

Lokapala Sabhakhyana Parva, Chapter 5:

Rajshuyarambha Parva, Chapter 15:

Jarasandhabadha Parva, Chapter 22:

Rajsuyika Parva, Chapter 33:

See also
Previous book of Mahabharata: Adi Parva
Next book of Mahabharata: Vana Parva

References

External links
 Sabha Parva, Translation by Kisari Mohan Ganguli
 Sabha Parva, Translation by Manmatha Nath Dutt
 Le Mahabharata, Translation in French, by H. Fauche (Paris, 1868)
 மஹாபாரதம் தமிழில்.
 English Translation by Kisari Mohan Ganguli, Another archive
 
 Sabha Parva in Sanskrit by Vyasadeva and commentary by Nilakantha (Editor: Kinjawadekar, 1929)
 A critical, less corrupted edition of Sabha Parva, Mahabharata in Sanskrit Vishnu S. Sukthankar; A review of this critical edition by T. Burrow

Parvas in Mahabharata